Monument au Fantôme (English: Monument to the Phantom) is an outdoor sculpture by French sculptor Jean Dubuffet, installed on Avenida de las Americas at Discovery Green in Houston, Texas, United States. The painted fiberglass and steel frame sculpture features seven individual forms that represent features of Houston, including a chimney, church, dog, hedge, mast, phantom, and tree. Donated by the Dan Duncan family, it is part of Dubuffet's Hourloupe series, which has companion sculptures in Chicago, New York, and in Europe.

See also

 List of public art in Houston

References

External links
 Downtown sculpture to see greener pastures by Nancy Sarnoff (July 3, 2007), Houston Chronicle
 Monument au Fantome, Jean Dubuffet, Houston at Waymarking

Downtown Houston
Fiberglass sculptures in Texas
Outdoor sculptures in Houston
Steel sculptures in Texas
Works by French people